The Gulf of Tonkin is a gulf at the northwestern portion of the South China Sea, located off the coasts of Tonkin (northern Vietnam) and South China. It is defined in the west and northwest by the northern coastline of Vietnam down to the Hòn La Island, in the north by China's Guangxi Zhuang Autonomous Region, and to the east by the Leizhou Peninsula and Hainan Island.

Description and etymology
It should not to be confused with Tokyo, which is also written "" and also means "eastern capital". During the French colonial era, the northern region of today’s Vietnam was called Tonkin.

Bắc Bộ is the native Vietnamese name of Tonkin.

History

Gulf of Tonkin incident

On 4 August 1964, United States President Lyndon B. Johnson claimed that North Vietnamese forces had twice attacked American destroyers in the Gulf of Tonkin. Known today as the Gulf of Tonkin Incident, this event spawned the Gulf of Tonkin Resolution of 7 August 1964, ultimately leading to open war between North Vietnam and South Vietnam. It furthermore foreshadowed the major escalation of the Vietnam War in South Vietnam, which began with the landing of US regular combat troops at Da Nang in 1965.

See also
 Geography of China
 Geography of Vietnam
 Tonkin Gulf Yacht Club

References

Further reading

 
 

 
Tonkin
Bodies of water of the South China Sea
Gulfs of China
South China
Gulfs of Vietnam
Bodies of water of Guangdong
Bodies of water of Guangxi
Bodies of water of Hainan
Maritime Southeast Asia